The 16th Golden Globe Awards, honoring the best in film for 1958 films, were held on March 5, 1959.

Winners and nominees

Film

Best Film - Drama
 The Defiant Ones
Cat on a Hot Tin Roof
Home Before Dark
I Want to Live!
Separate Tables

Best Film - Comedy
 Auntie Mame
Bell, Book and Candle
Indiscreet
Me and the Colonel
The Perfect Furlough

Best Film - Musical
 Gigi
Damn Yankees
South Pacific
Tom Thumb

Best Actor - Drama
 David Niven – Separate Tables
Tony Curtis – The Defiant Ones
Robert Donat – The Inn of the Sixth Happiness (posthumous nomination)
Sidney Poitier – The Defiant Ones
Spencer Tracy – The Old Man and the Sea

Best Actress - Drama
 Susan Hayward – I Want to Live!
Ingrid Bergman – The Inn of the Sixth Happiness
Deborah Kerr – Separate Tables
Shirley MacLaine – Some Came Running
Jean Simmons – Home Before Dark

Best Actor - Comedy or Musical
 Danny Kaye – Me and the Colonel
Maurice Chevalier – Gigi
Clark Gable – Teacher's Pet
Cary Grant – Indiscreet
Louis Jourdan – Gigi

Best Actress - Comedy or Musical
 Rosalind Russell – Auntie Mame
 Ingrid Bergman – Indiscreet
 Leslie Caron – Gigi
 Doris Day – The Tunnel of Love
 Mitzi Gaynor – South Pacific

Best Supporting Actor
 Burl Ives – The Big Country
Harry Guardino – Houseboat
David Ladd – The Proud Rebel
Gig Young – Teacher's Pet
Efrem Zimbalist, Jr. – Home Before Dark

Best Supporting Actress
 Hermione Gingold – Gigi
Peggy Cass – Auntie Mame
Wendy Hiller – Separate Tables
Maureen Stapleton – Lonelyhearts
Cara Williams – The Defiant Ones

Best Director
 Vincente Minnelli – Gigi
Richard Brooks – Cat on a Hot Tin Roof 
Stanley Kramer – The Defiant Ones
Delbert Mann – Separate Tables 
Robert Wise – I Want to Live!

Best Foreign-Language Foreign Film
 Das Mädchen Rosemarie (West Germany)
 L'Eau vive (France)
 The Road a Year Long (Yugoslavia)

Best English-Language Foreign Film
 A Night to Remember

Best Film - Promoting International Understanding
 The Inn of the Sixth Happiness
The Defiant Ones
Me and the Colonel
A Time to Love and a Time to Die
The Young Lions

Samuel Goldwyn International Film Award
 Do Aankhen Barah Haath

Henrietta Award (World Film Favorite)
Rock Hudson
Deborah Kerr

Television

Best TV Show
The Ann Sothern Show
Letter to Loretta
The Red Skelton Show
Toast of the Town
Tonight!

Most Promising Newcomer - Male
Bradford Dillman
John Gavin
Efrem Zimbalist, Jr.
 David Ladd
 Ricky Nelson
 Ray Stricklyn

Most Promising Newcomer - Female
Linda Cristal
Susan Kohner
Tina Louise
 Joanna Barnes
 Carol Lynley
 France Nuyen

Achievement in Television
Red Skelton

Special Award
David Ladd (For best juvenile actor)
Shirley MacLaine (For most versatile actress)

Cecil B. DeMille Award
Maurice Chevalier

References
IMdb 1959 Golden Globe Awards

016
1958 film awards
1958 television awards
1958 awards in the United States
March 1959 events in the United States